Nevada Policy Research Institute is a private non-profit, free-market and limited-government policy research organization based in Las Vegas, Nevada. Nevada Policy seeks to promote private, rather than government solutions to issues facing Nevada and the western region of the United States.

History
In 1990, Judy Cresanta supported Soviet pro-democracy leaders, educating them in the principles of the free market economy and free elections. The next year, she founded the Nevada Policy Research Institute, which addresses public problems through solutions that foster freedom and introduce new ways of problem solving in fields such as government spending, taxation, the restriction of union powers, federal ownership of state owned land, energy policy, and education policy.

Since 2013, Nevada Policy's "Solutions" publication for lawmakers has been published every two years. Nevada Policy supports lawmakers in an advisory capacity and through assessment of legislation. Their staff is often asked to give evidence before legislative committees. The national press relies on their advice and evaluations on breaking news and reports on their research, campaigns and litigation attempts. The institute works towards  increased transparency in government publishing records of government employee compensation and retirement data on TransparentNevada.com and has successfully campaigned for public-sector workers and school district employees to make use of their opt-out rights of their union membership. This led to the inauguration of the National Employee Freedom Week, establishing priority of workers' rights over the preferences of unions. Nevada Policy forged an alliance with more than 100 national and state-based organizations, including the Mackinac Center for Public Policy, the Buckeye Institute, and The Heritage Foundation.

Public policy research

Nevada Policy researches education, tax and fiscal policy, and labor issues related to Nevada public policy.

Education 

Nevada Policy opposes efforts to halt the opening of new charter schools and favors expanding charter school options, tuition tax credits, school voucher programs, and merit pay for teachers.

Nevada Policy has been critical of the Nevada System of Higher Education, specifically the University of Nevada, Las Vegas and the University of Nevada, Reno for low graduation rates, despite spending above average per full-time student on education and education related higher education expenditures.

Tax and fiscal policy 

Nevada Policy supports a balanced budget with controlled growth in government spending, such as a TABOR's or TASC amendment. Nevada Policy claims Nevada's 2008-2009 budget deficit was the result of excessive growth in government spending.

Nevada Policy has also argued that Nevada's history as a low-tax state has been slowly eroded by a growing number of fees on Nevada's residents.

Nevada Policy opposes tax hikes on individual taxpayers and corporations within Nevada, including a tax hike on the gaming industry.

Labor issues 

Nevada Policy supports protecting secret ballot boxes and paycheck protection and opposes defined benefit plans for union and government workers.

LVCVA 

On November 30, 2008, the Las Vegas Review Journal published an article regarding some investigative journalism conducted by Nevada Policy on the Las Vegas Convention and Visitors Authority. According to Nevada Policy's investigation, it appears the LVCVA has an inappropriate relationship with a private marketing firm, R&R, that has overbilled the LVCVA but the LVCVA has never attempted to ''recoup these losses.

Through public records request Nevada Policy found that the LVCVA not only knew about these irregularities but literally gave R&R the rubber stamp to approve expenditures above $5,000 without any oversight from the LVCVA.

According to Nevada Policy vice president, "In the days following the release of this project, multiple private investigators visited the institute's offices requesting our financial statements and claiming to be working for "the other side." Some of our board members have been approached with broad hints about retaliation if the institute's look into convention authority financing proceeds."

Assets
As of 2017, Nevada Policy had total assets of $580,617.

Funding details
Funding details as of 2017:

See also 

 Classical liberalism
 Conservatism
 Libertarianism
 2008 Nevada budget crisis

References

External links 
 
 Organizational Profile – National Center for Charitable Statistics (Urban Institute)

Organizations based in Nevada
Politics of Nevada
Political and economic think tanks in the United States
Libertarian think tanks
Libertarian organizations based in the United States